Lake Giba is a reservoir under construction at the border of the Inderta; Kilte Awula'ilo and Dogu’a Tembien woredas of the Tigray Region in Ethiopia. The earthen dam that holds the reservoir is under construction in 2020. It will collect the water from the catchments of Sulluh River (969 km²), Genfel River (733 km²) and Agula'i River (692 km²).

Dam characteristics 
The dam is aimed to provide drinking water to Mekelle and to regulate the river flow.
 Dam height: 80 metres
 Dam crest length: 1000 metres

Capacity 
 Original capacity: 350 million m³
 Reservoir area: 9 km³
Average annual sediment input to the reservoir by the main rivers was calculated as 3.8 million tonnes:
 Sulluh: 862,410 t
 Genfel: 364,301 t
 Agula'i River: 2,618,528 t

Flooding 
The dam will occupy the wide valley bottom at the river confluences, which is currently occupied by farmlands and bushlands. The reservoir will extend into the lower Genfel and Suluh gorges, in a place called Shugu’a Shugu’i. No people are permanently living in the area that will be flooded. Current dryland villages Ch’in Feres (in Inderta), Addi Atereman and Worgesha (in Dogu’a Tembien) will become lakeshore villages, and Genfel church in the homonymous gorge will be on the edge of Lake Giba.

Anticipated seepage 
The lithology of the dam building site is Antalo Limestone. Part of its water is anticipated to be lost through seepage; the positive side-effect is that this will contribute to groundwater recharge in the downstream areas.

References 

Giba
Tigray Region
Dogu'a Tembien